Katarina Martinson (born 1981) is a Swedish billionaire businesswoman. She owns 14% of L E Lundbergforetagen, the family holding company, which owns property, pulp and paper companies, and was founded by her grandfather Lars Erik Lundberg.

She was born in 1981, the daughter of Fredrik Lundberg. She has a master's degree from the Stockholm School of Economics.

She is a director of L E Lundbergforetagen.

Martinson is married, and lives in Stockholm, Sweden.

References

1981 births
Female billionaires
Living people
Lundberg family
Swedish businesspeople
Swedish billionaires